Kobayashi's horned frog (Pelobatrachus kobayashii) is a species of amphibian in the family Megophryidae.
It is endemic to Sabah in Malaysia, including Mount Kinabalu.
Its natural habitats are subtropical or tropical moist montane forests and rivers.

Formerly placed in the genus Megophrys, it was reclassified into the genus Pelobatrachus in 2021.

References

Pelobatrachus
Amphibians of Borneo
Endemic fauna of Borneo
Amphibians of Malaysia
Endemic fauna of Malaysia
Taxonomy articles created by Polbot
Amphibians described in 1997
Taxa named by Masafumi Matsui